Thomas O'Connell (born 2000) is an Irish hurler who plays for Cork Senior Championship club Midleton and at inter-county level with the Cork senior hurling team. He usually lines out as a right wing-forward.

Playing career

Christian Brothers College

O'Connel first came to prominence as a hurler with Christian Brothers College in Cork. He played in every grade of hurling before eventually joining the college's senior hurling team and lined out in several Harty Cup campaigns.

University of Limerick

As a student at the University of Limerick, O'Connell immediately became involved in hurling. On 4 April 2019, he lined out at left corner-forward when the University of Limerick faced the Limerick Institute of Technology in the All-Ireland Freshers' Championship final. O'Connell top scored with 0-09 and collected a winners' medal following the 3–17 to 1–10 victory.

Midleton

O'Connell joined the Midleton club at a young age and played in all grades at juvenile and underage levels. On 12 October 2018, he was at midfield when Midleton faced Blarney in the final of the Premier 1 MHC. O'Connell scored a point from a free in the 1–22 to 1–10 victory.

On 14 October 2018, O'Connell lined out for the Midleton senior team that faced Imokilly in the final of the Cork Senior Championship. After starting the game on the bench he was introduced as a 43rd-minute substitute in the 4–19 to 1–18 defeat.

Cork

Under-17 and under-20

O'Connell first lined out for Cork as a member of the under-17 team during the 2017 Munster Championship. He made his first appearance at left wing-forward on 11 April and scored five points in a 0–16 to 0–06 defeat of Limerick. On 25 April, O'Connell won a Munster Championship medal after scoring four points in the 3–13 to 1–12 defeat of Waterford in the final. He was again at right wing-forward for Cork's 1–19 to 1-17 All-Ireland final defeat of Dublin at Croke Park on 6 August.

On 3 July 2019, O'Connell made his first appearance for Cork's inaugural under-20 team in the Munster Championship. He lined out at midfield in the 1–20 to 0–16 defeat of Limerick. On 23 July 2019, O'Connell scored a point from right wing-forward when Cork suffered a 3–15 to 2–17 defeat by Tipperary in the Munster final. He was selected at midfield when Cork faced Tipperary for a second time in the All-Ireland final on 24 August 2019 but spent much of the game at centre-forward. O'Connell scored 1-02 but was sent off after receiving a second yellow card in the 5–17 to 1–18 defeat.

Senior

O'Connell was added to the Cork senior team in January 2019. He was an unused substitute when Cork suffered a 2–18 to 0–17 defeat by Kilkenny on 27 January.

Career statistics

Club

Inter-county

Honours

University of Limerick
All-Ireland Freshers' Hurling Championship (1): 2019

Midleton
Cork Premier 1 Minor Hurling Championship (1): 2018

Cork
Canon O'Brien Cup (1): 2019
All-Ireland Under-20 Hurling Championship (1): 2020
Munster Under-20 Hurling Championship (1): 2020
All-Ireland Under-17 Hurling Championship (1): 2017
Munster Under-17 Hurling Championship (1): 2017

References

2000 births
Living people
Midleton hurlers
Cork inter-county hurlers